Frea maculicornis is a species of beetle in the family Cerambycidae. It was described by Thomson in 1858.

Varietas
 Frea maculicornis var. fuscomaculata Quedenfeldt, 1882
 Frea maculicornis var. hintzi Plavilstshikov, 1927
 Frea maculicornis var. nigrofasciata Breuning, 1942

References

maculicornis
Beetles described in 1858